Are You Bald? - EP was a promotional EP released on Vagrant Records by the American rock quartet Dr Manhattan.  The EP was released on iTunes on December 11, 2007.  The EP included one brand new song, one old song that was re-recorded for the band's debut, and one song off of their first EP, For the Lonely Lest the Wiser.

Track listing
"Big Chomper, Big Chomper" - 3:15
"Claims Should Echo" - 3:10
"Breath of an Epoch" - 3:05

2007 EPs
Dr Manhattan (band) EPs
Vagrant Records EPs